Devil's Haircut can refer to:

"Devil's Haircut" (Grounded for Life episode)
"Devils Haircut", a song by Beck which appears on the album Odelay